Marco Antonio Rioja (born 1 April 1964) is a Spanish fencer. He competed in the team sabre event at the 1992 Summer Olympics.

References

External links
 

1964 births
Living people
Spanish male sabre fencers
Olympic fencers of Spain
Fencers at the 1992 Summer Olympics
Fencers from Madrid